Fond du Sac is a village in Mauritius located in Pamplemousses District. The village is administered by the Fond du Sac Village Council under the aegis of the Pamplemousses District Council. According to a census taken by Statistics Mauritius in 2011, the population was at 5,186.

See also 
 Districts of Mauritius
 List of places in Mauritius

References 

Populated places in Mauritius
Pamplemousses District